The Wall mansion is one of the Twenty-eight mansions of the Chinese constellations.  It is one of the northern mansions of the Black Tortoise.

Asterisms

References 

Chinese constellations